The so-called Organ Pipes are situated near the small inselberg of Burnt Mountain, west of the town of Khorixas in Namibia. They are a rock formation that comprises a group of columnar basalts which resemble organ pipes.

The Organ Pipes were formed about 150 million years ago as the result of the intrusion of liquid lava into a slate rock formation, which was exposed over time by erosion.

References

External links 

Geology of Namibia
Columnar basalts
Geography of Kunene Region